Akola district (Marathi pronunciation: [əkolaː]) is a district in the Indian state of Maharashtra. The city of Akola is the district headquarters. Akola district forms the central part of Amravati Division, which was the former British Raj Berar Province.

Area of the district is 5,428 km². It is bounded on the north and east by Amravati District, to the south by Washim District, and to the west by Buldhana District. Washim was earlier a part of Akola till 1999. Akola district includes seven talukas which are Akola, Akot, Telhara, Balapur, Barshitakli, Murtijapur and Patur.

Officer

Members of Parliament

Sanjay Dhotre (BJP) - Akola

Guardian Minister

List of Guardian Minister

District Magistrate/Collector

list of District Magistrate / Collector

History

The Battle of Adgaon Bk village is located in Telhara Tehsil, took place on 28 November 1803, between the British under the command of Governor Arthur Wellesley and the forces of Maratha under Bhonsle of Nagpur during Second Anglo-Maratha War.

Many old forts are located in Akola District viz.
 Narnala Fort
 Akola Fort
 Balapur Fort
 Vari Bhairavgad fort, Telhara Tehsil.

Geography

Akola district lies in the northern plains of the Deccan Plateau. Akola district covers mostly plain topology with isolated hills and mounds except for the mountain ranges of Ajintha (Ajanta), located in the Southern tehsils of Patur and Barshi Takli, and the Satpuda mountain range that occupies some areas in the Northern tehsils of Akot and Telhara. The elevation profile of the district falls sharply as we proceed towards the central region from the North and then rises steadily as we head to the South from the centre. Highest point in the District is located within the premises of the hill-fort of Narnala measuring 932m above sea level.

Rivers and lakes
The Purna River forms the part of north boundary of the district, and the top north portion of the district lies within its watershed along with Aas River and Shahnur River. The Vaan River forms the part of northwest boundary of the district after entering from the Amravati district.

The Mun River drains the southwestern portion of the district, Morna River drains the midsouth portion of the district, while the southeast is drained by the Katepurna River and Uma River.

Here are some of the rivers in Akola, with their tributaries

 Uma River
 Katepurna River
 Shahanur River
 Morna River
 Mun River
 Mas River
 Utawali River
 Vishwamitri River
 Nirguna River
 Gandhari River
 Aas River
 Vaan River

Prominent persons
Vijay P. Bhatkar, Architect of India's First Super Computer.
Vasantrao Deshpande, legendary classical singer.
Anand Modak, famous marathi music composer and musician.
Patrick Barr, British TV and Film actor.

Climate
Akola district shows a little variation in its climate along the north–south direction. Akola district mainly features Tropical Savannah Climate. But the Northern parts of the district consisting of hills and mountains that are raised to about 950 to 1000 meters shows a subtropical climate featuring cool winters. The summers are extremely hot while the winters are dry and mild to cool as the temperature may drop to or below 2 °C. The district has recorded a minimum temperature of 2 °C while a maximum of 47.7 °C. Akola has recorded a minimum temperature of 11.9 °C in the month of May which is considered to be the hottest month in the state of Maharashtra.

Demographics
According to the 2011 census Akola district has a population of 1,813,906, roughly equal to the nation of Kosovo or the US state of Nebraska. This gives it a ranking of 262nd in India (out of a total of 640). Its population growth rate over the decade 2001-2011 was 11.6%. Akola has a sex ratio of 942 females for every 1000 males, and a literacy rate of 88.05%. Scheduled Castes and Scheduled Tribes make up 20.07% and 5.53% of the population respectively.

Religion

Languages

At the time of the 2011 Census of India, 70.39% of the population in the district spoke Marathi, 17.33% Urdu, 6.30% Hindi, 2.04% Lambadi and 0.93% Marwari as their first language.

Varhadi dialect of Marathi is the main spoken language of Akola district. Deccani Urdu is popular among the Muslim community.

Subdivisions
Akola District consists of talukas namely Akot, Telhara, Akola, Balapur, Patur, Barshitakli and Murtajapur.

Transport
Important railway stations with their codes are Paras, Gaigaon, Akola Junction (AK), Murtijapur Junction (MZR) and are under Bhusawal-Badnera Section of Bhusawal Railway Division of Central Railway.

The other stations under meter gauge are Hiwarkhed, Adgaon Buzurg (ABZ), Akot (AKOT), Patsul (PTZ), Ugwe (UGWE), Akola Junction, Shivani Shivpur (SVW), Barshitakli (BSQ), Lohogad (LHD), Amna Vadi (AMW), Jaulka (JUK) are under Purna - Khandwa Section of South Central Railway.

The stations under narrow gauge are Lakhpuri, Murtajapur Junction, Karanja under two Narrow Gauge Branch lines viz Murtajapur-Achalpur and Murtajapur-Yavatmal of Bhusawal Railway Division of Central Railway.

Economy
Cotton and Jawar are the predominant crops grown in the district. Oil and Dal mills are also rampant. The economy is mostly agriculture based. Nowadays, soybean crop is an important crop as major soybean plants have come up in the area.

See also
Make In Maharashtra

References

External links
 Akola district official website

 
Districts of Maharashtra
Amravati division
Vidarbha